is a Japanese anthology manga series written and illustrated by Shunji Enomoto. It was serialized in Shogakukan's seinen manga magazine Monthly Ikki from January 2013 to September 2014, when the magazine ceased its publication, and continued its publication directly in tankōbon format. Shogakukan released three volumes.

Publication
Written and illustrated by Shunji Enomoto, Kajiba no Baka IQ was serialized in Shogakukan's seinen manga magazine Monthly Ikki from January 25, 2013, until the magazine's final issue, released on September 25, 2014. Shogakukan collected its chapters in two tankōbon volumes, which were released on December 27, 2013, and July 30, 2014. Following the suspension of Monthly Ikki, the series continued its publication directly in tankōbon format. The third and final volume was released on January 30, 2019.

Volume list

References

External links
 

Comedy anime and manga
Manga anthologies
Seinen manga
Shogakukan manga
Shunji Enomoto